Erythroecia was a genus of moths of the family Noctuidae, it is now considered a synonym of Psectrotarsia.

Former species
 Psectrotarsia hebardi Skinner, 1917
 Psectrotarsia suavis (H. Edwards, 1884)

References
Natural History Museum Lepidoptera genus database
Erythroecia at funet

Heliothinae